Martin Svec (born 24 October 1994 in Brno) is a Czech professional squash player. As of December 2022, he was ranked number 72 in the world. He won the 2018 Keith Grainger Memorial UCT Open.

References

1994 births
Living people
Czech male squash players
Sportspeople from Brno
Competitors at the 2022 World Games